The Royal Park Hotel, established in 1989, is one of the largest hotels in Sha Tin, New Territories, Hong Kong. Owned by Sun Hung Kai Properties, the 443-room hotel is part of phase two of New Town Plaza, the largest shopping centre in the district.

History

Background
The site of the hotel used to be part of RAF Shatin, a Royal Air Force airbase with a single concrete runway. The lot was leased to developer Sun Hung Kai Properties in the early 1980s as part of the development of Sha Tin New Town.

The hotel and the adjacent New Town Tower (an office building) comprise phase two of the New Town Plaza development.

Construction and opening
While under construction, the project was named "New Town Hotel". The main contractor was SHK Shimizu, a joint venture between Sun Hung Kai Properties and the Japanese construction firm Shimizu Corporation. The hotel and the adjacent New Town Tower were formally topped out on 1 November 1988.

The hotel primarily targeted business travellers, particularly those dealing with the manufacturing and garment companies in the industrial estates of the New Territories. The Tiananmen Square massacre occurred while construction was nearing completion, leading Sun Hung Kai to revise its first-year occupancy target for the hotel downwards due to the slump in the travel industry.

The hotel began operations on 3 August 1989 with a soft opening that saw 170 of the rooms put into use. It was formally opened on 1 December 1989 by Secretary for Planning, Environment and Lands Graham Barnes. The hotel, built at a cost of around HK$400 million (excluding the land cost), originally had 442 rooms.

2008 Beijing Olympics
During the Beijing Olympics in 2008, the hotel served as an Olympic Village providing accommodation to equestrian competitors and support staff.

Renovations
A renovation of the main lobby was completed in 2005. In August 2007, renovations of the guestrooms were completed.

A renovation of the hotel's largest banquet hall was completed in May 2018. The venue now includes an outdoor garden.

Facilities
It has a total of 443 guestrooms and suites. Dining facilities include Japanese and Chinese restaurants and a buffet serving breakfast, lunch, and dinner. The hotel also has a gym, a swimming pool, and events facilities.

Transport
Royal Park Hotel is within walking distance of Sha Tin station. There is also a Kowloon Motor Bus (KMB) stop in front of the hotel.

See also
 Royal Plaza Hotel (Hong Kong)

References

External links

 

1989 establishments in Hong Kong
Hotel buildings completed in 1989
Hotels established in 1989
Hotels in Hong Kong
Olympic Villages
Sha Tin
Sha Tin District
Sun Hung Kai Properties